Valentina Valeryevna Legkostupova (30 December 1965 — 14 August 2020) was a Soviet and Russian pop singer, teacher, producer, and Honored Artist of the Russian Federation (2001).

Biography
Legkostupova was born on 30 December 1965 in Khabarovsk to Valery Vladimirovich Legkostupov and Galina Ivanovna Legkostupova. 

The debut of the singer on the stage took place in 1985 in Kherson of the Ukrainian SSR a solo concert with a band led by Senya Son.

On 30 June 1986, Legkostupova received the second prize of the 1st All-Union Television  Jurmala Young Pop Singer Competition, where she performed with the songs  The Shore of Happiness  (Vladimir Danilin, Senya Son  — Ilya Reznik) and I Still Hope  (Margarita Pushkina  — Kris Kelmi). 

She was married to Aleksey Grigoriev, the son of sound director Yuri Grigoriev. They have two children: a daughter called Anetta and a son, Matvey.

In 2014, Legkostupova moved to a permanent residence on the island of Tenerife. There, she was mostly engaged in real estate, but did not stop her concert and teaching activities. In August 2016, she launched her production centre VL Music.

In early 2018, she moved to Feodosia, where she headed the Feodosia's  Department of Culture. She resigned in September 2018.

References

External links
 Official site
 
  Надо как-то зарабатывать на памперсы

1965 births
2020 deaths
People from Khabarovsk
Soviet women singers
Honored Artists of the Russian Federation
Russian educational theorists
20th-century Russian women singers
20th-century Russian singers
21st-century Russian women singers
21st-century Russian singers
Burials in Troyekurovskoye Cemetery